SY Lady of the Lake may refer to:

SY Lady of the Lake (1859), a vessel built in 1859 for service on Coniston Water in the English Lake District 
SY Lady of the Lake (1877), a vessel built in 1877 for service on Ullswater in the English Lake District and since converted to the MY Lady of the Lake
SY Lady of the Lake (1908), a vessel built in 1908 to replace the 1859 vessel on Coniston Water in the English Lake District